Nerlandsøya is an island in the municipality of Herøy in Møre og Romsdal county, Norway. The island is located northwest of the town of Fosnavåg and east of the island of Skorpa. The island is connected to the island Bergsøya (to the southeast) by the Nerlandsøy Bridge. The Flåvær islands lie to the south. In 2015, there were 888 residents living on the island. The largest village on the island is Kvalsund.

See also
List of islands of Norway

References

Islands of Møre og Romsdal
Herøy, Møre og Romsdal
Sunnmøre